In material science, layered materials are solids with highly anisotropic bonding, in which two-dimensional sheets are internally strongly bonded, but only weakly bonded to adjacent layers.  Owing to their distinctive structures, layered materials are often suitable for intercalation reactions. 

One large family of layered materials are metal dichalcogenides. In such materials, the M-chalcogen bonding is strong and covalent. These materials exhibit anisotropic electronic properties such as thermal and electrical conductivity.

Exfoliation
Because the layers bond to each other by relatively weak van der Waals forces, some layered materials are amenable to exfoliation, the complete separation of the layers of the material. Exfoliation can be done using sonication, mechanical, hydrothermal, electrochemical, laser-assisted, and microwave-assisted methods.

Typically aggressive conditions are required involving highly polar solvents and reagents. In the ideal case, exfoliation affords single-layer materials, such as graphene.

Examples
metal dichalcogenides such as tantalum disulfide, titanium disulfide, and vanadium disulfide.
graphite
iron oxychloride
layered double hydroxides, ionic solids where intercalated anions are exchangeable.

References